Bolsena can refer to the following items:

 Bolsena, a town of Lazio
 Lake Bolsena, the lake on which Bolsena is situated
 Bolsena Lacus, a Hydrocarbon lake on Titan
 Corporal of Bolsena, a relic of the Roman Catholic Church
 Andrea Adami da Bolsena, an Italian musician
 The Mass at Bolsena, a painting

See also
 Volsinii (disambiguation)